Ardisia carchiana is a species of plant in the family Primulaceae. It is endemic to Ecuador.

References

Endemic flora of Ecuador
carchiana
Vulnerable plants
Taxonomy articles created by Polbot